The Lahore City Cricket Association Ground (formerly known as Punjab Cricket Association Ground) is a cricket ground located opposite to Gaddafi Stadium in Lahore, Pakistan. This ground is used for domestic First-class cricket, List A cricket and Twenty20 cricket matches. The acting President of Lahore City Cricket Association is Mr. Aizad Hussain Sayid.
From 1980 to November 2012, 265 First-class cricket matches, 105 List A cricket matches and 12 Twenty20 cricket matches has been played on this ground.

Lahore City Cricket Association is determined to make ground, an international standard facility where state of the art cricket facilities are available under one roof. Floodlights will be installed here to develop a new culture of night cricket in the Lahore city.

Pakistan Cricket Board has decided to stage 2012–13 Faysal Bank T20 Cup in Lahore between December 1 and 9, 2012. The tournament will now be played in three different grounds of Lahore which includes Gaddafi Stadium, Bagh-e-Jinnah and Lahore City Cricket Association Ground. Lahore City Cricket Association Ground will host 14 Twenty20 cricket matches.

See also
List of cricket grounds in Pakistan
 Lahore City Cricket Association Ground

References

Cricket grounds in Pakistan
Cricket in Lahore